The Ealdwood Stories, also known as the Arafel Stories, are a collection of fantasy works by American writer C. J. Cherryh. The books are works of high fantasy based in part on Celtic mythology. Arafel, a main character, is a Daoine Sidhe, the highest of the Sidhe faery-folk. She dwells in the magical small forest of Ealdwood, from which the tales take their name.

Works
"The Dreamstone" (1979) – short story first published in Amazons! (DAW), edited by Jessica Amanda Salmonson
Ealdwood (1981, Victor Gollancz) – novella
The Dreamstone (1983, DAW) – novel, included revisions of "The Dreamstone" (1979) and Ealdwood (1981), plus additional material
The Tree of Swords and Jewels (1983, DAW) – novel, sequel to The Dreamstone (1983)

Omnibuses
The Dreamstone (1983) and The Tree of Swords and Jewels (1983) have been republished in several omnibuses, some with substantial revisions. Cherryh also wrote a new ending which she felt was more appropriate and satisfying than her previous efforts.
Arafel's Saga (1983, DAW)
Ealdwood (1991, Victor Gollancz) – includes revisions and a new ending
The Dreaming Tree (1997, DAW) – includes the revisions and new ending in the Ealdwood (1991) omnibus
"The Dreamstone" short story was later reprinted in The Collected Short Fiction of C. J. Cherryh (2004).

Award nominations
Ealdwood – 1982 World Fantasy Award for Best Novella
Ealdwood – 1982 Locus Award for Best Novella
The Dreamstone – 1984 Locus Award for Best Fantasy NovelThe Tree of Swords and Jewels – 1984 Locus Award for Best Fantasy NovelArafel's Saga – 1984 Science Fiction Book Club selection

References
Cherryh, C. J.  "The Dreamstone", in Amazons!, Jessica Amanda Salmonson ed., 1979.
Cherryh, C. J.  Ealdwood, Donald M. Grant, 1981.
Cherryh, C. J.  The Dreamstone, DAW Books, 1983.
Cherryh, C. J.  The Tree of Swords and Jewels, DAW Books, 1983.
Cherryh, C. J.  Arafel's Saga, omnibus, Nelson Doubleday / Science Fiction Book Club, 1983.
Cherryh, C. J.  Ealdwood, omnibus, Victor Gollancz, 1991, .
Cherryh, C. J.  The Dreaming Tree'', omnibus, DAW Books, 1997.

External links
.

American fantasy novels
Series of fantasy books by C. J. Cherryh
DAW Books books
1980s fantasy novels
Book series introduced in 1979